Law & Order is a media franchise composed of a number of related American television series created by Dick Wolf and produced by Wolf Entertainment.  They were originally broadcast on NBC, and all of them deal with some aspect of the criminal justice system. Together, the original series, its various spin-offs, the TV film, and crossover episodes from other shows constitute over 1,000 hours of programming.

Shared people and resources in a common fictional setting are the connecting links between the shows, e.g., Hudson University and the New York Ledger tabloid newspaper. Many supporting characters, such as district attorneys, psychologists, and medical examiners are also shared among the shows. Occasionally, crossovers of main characters or shared storylines between two of the shows will occur. A few major characters have also left the cast of one show within the franchise only to eventually join another. The music, style, and credits of the shows tend to be similar, with the voiceover in the opening of every series performed by Steven Zirnkilton. The shows share the iconic "dun, dun" sound effect of a jail cell locking, created, along with the theme songs, by Mike Post. Past episodes of the American series are in syndication with local over-the-air stations, along with cable channels such as USA Network and Bravo (both owned by the franchise's production company, NBCUniversal), TNT, WGN America, Ion Television, and AMC Networks' SundanceTV and WeTV, showing episodes sometimes up to six times a day.

In October 2012, Law & Order: Special Victims Unit showrunner/executive producer Warren Leight said of the future of the Law & Order franchise, "[Dick Wolf and I] sometimes talk in general terms of where (the franchise) could go. I'm curious to see if there's another iteration somewhere down the line," he says. "We try hard to maintain a certain level of quality which I think is why the shows sustained in reruns so well. And I'd like to believe there's room for another generation in some way." In February 2015, NBC was purported to have interest in bringing back the flagship Law & Order as a limited series. On September 28, 2021, NBC announced that a 21st season had been ordered.

Current series

Law & Order

 22 seasons, 481 episodes (September 13, 1990 – May 24, 2010; February 24, 2022 – present)
Law & Order, a crime procedural, features both a police investigation of a crime discovered during the cold open, and a prosecution case set forth by the New York County District Attorney, at the Manhattan DA's office. The first thirty minutes of an episode typically features a lead detective trio. On May 14, 2010, NBC announced that it was canceling the original series, although various spin-offs would continue. The series finale aired on May 24, 2010. Wolf briefly attempted to continue the series on cable, but the series "moved into the history books".

On September 28, 2021, NBC announced that a 21st season had been ordered. In season 21 the police team are Detective Kevin Bernard (Anthony Anderson), Detective Frank Cosgrove (Jeffrey Donovan), and Lieutenant Kate Dixon (Camryn Manheim), while the counterparts on the legal side are DA Jack McCoy (Sam Waterston), ADA Samantha Maroun (Odelya Halevi), and EADA Nolan Price (Hugh Dancy).

Law & Order: Special Victims Unit

 24 seasons, 531 episodes (September 20, 1999 – present)
SVU follows the cases investigated by NYPD Captain Olivia Benson (Mariska Hargitay) and her Manhattan Special Victims Unit colleagues. The show's focus is on detectives who investigate sexually based crimes and crimes against children, the elderly, and the disabled. At the start of season twenty-three, these detectives included characters Det. Amanda Rollins (Kelli Giddish), Sgt. Odafin Tutuola (Ice-T) and Det. Joe Velasco (Octavio Pisano), while Peter Scanavino co-stars as ADA Dominick Carisi, Jr. Season twenty-three premiered on September 23, 2021. In February 2020, the series was renewed through the 24th season.

Law & Order: Organized Crime

 3 seasons, 45 episodes (April 1, 2021 – present)
Organized Crime follows the cases investigated by former SVU detective Elliot Stabler (Christopher Meloni) as part of the task force within the Organized Crime Control Bureau headed by Sergeant Ayanna Bell (Danielle Moné Truitt). The show's focus is on detectives who investigate mobsters and other criminal syndicates. On March 31, 2020, NBC ordered a 13-episode season of a then-untitled Special Victims Unit spin-off starring Christopher Meloni as Stabler, now in an NYPD organized crime task force. Meloni had previously starred on SVU from 1999 to 2011. The show's title was confirmed to be Law & Order: Organized Crime. Writer Craig Gore was fired from the series in June following backlash from a social media post. When NBC announced its fall schedule on June 16, Organized Crime was the only new show on the schedule, slotted for Thursdays at 10 p.m. Eastern. Due to filming stoppages related to COVID-19, the season was shortened to eight episodes and premiered on April 1, 2021. In May 2021, the series was renewed for a second season.

Past series

Law & Order: Criminal Intent

 10 seasons, 195 episodes (September 30, 2001 – June 26, 2011)
Criminal Intent focuses on high-profile cases investigated by the Major Case Squad. Special attention is given to the actions of the criminals pursued, often including scenes from the victim's or perpetrator's lives not involving the police, thereby providing a hint as to the "criminal intent". The detectives depicted (Vincent D'Onofrio and Kathryn Erbe for the majority of the series, including the final season) will often attempt to infiltrate the mind of the suspect. Julia Ormond and Jay O. Sanders also star in the tenth season of the series. Unique to the franchise, pairs of detectives alternate episodes during seasons 5-8. On July 15, 2011, USA Network co-president Jeff Wachtel confirmed Law & Order: CI would end with its tenth season.

Law & Order: Trial by Jury

 1 season, 13 episodes (March 3, 2005 – January 21, 2006)
Trial by Jury, starring Bebe Neuwirth, Amy Carlson, and Jerry Orbach, followed the preparation by the legal teams, both prosecution and defense, for a jury trial. This was the first Law & Order spin-off to be canceled due to low ratings. Orbach's death (which occurred while the show was in production) was another factor in the show's cancellation.

Law & Order: LA

 1 season, 22 episodes (September 29, 2010 – July 11, 2011)
Originally titled Law & Order: Los Angeles, LA was the first American Law & Order series set outside of New York City. As with the original series, the first half hour of the show focused on the police investigation of a crime discovered in the cold open; the second half took place at the Los Angeles County District Attorney's office and focused on the prosecution of the criminal suspect(s). On May 13, 2011, Law & Order: LA was canceled by NBC after only one season, but its final episode didn't air until July 11, 2011.

Law & Order True Crime

 1 season, 8 episodes (September 26 – November 14, 2017) 
In April 2016, Wolf and NBC announced they were working on True Crime, a scripted anthology series that will follow one significant true-to-life case per season. Season one, titled Law & Order True Crime: The Menendez Murders stars Edie Falco as Leslie Abramson, Gaston Villanueva as Lyle Menendez, and Gus Halper as Erik Menendez. It premiered on September 26, 2017 and concluded its first season on November 14. The series is currently on hiatus.

Unproduced series

Law & Order: Hate Crimes
In September 2018, NBC announced that it had given an order of 13 episodes of the latest installment of the franchise, titled Law & Order: Hate Crimes, which would be introduced on Law & Order: SVU. Later, on March 4, 2019, NBC said that the series would be heading back into redevelopment to flesh out the concept and such an introduction on SVU would not take place. The series was once again touted in 2020 as part of a multi-year contract signed with creator Dick Wolf. The series would likely move to Peacock due to language concerns as of June 2020.

Law & Order: For the Defense
NBC had given a straight-to-series order to Law & Order: For the Defense on May 3, 2021, a new legal drama from creator Wolf that would take a look inside a criminal defense firm. The premise of the ordered series was to put defense attorneys under the microscope, along with the criminal justice system, with every week delivering the promise of a contemporary morality tale. On May 14, NBC announced that the series would premiere during the 2021–22 television season, leading off a trio of Law & Order franchise series on Thursdays in the same manner as the network's Wednesday Chicago grouping. On July 15, multiple trade publications reported that NBC and Wolf had mutually agreed to scrap the series, which had not yet cast any roles, and that a different spin-off (later revealed as the revival of the original series) was in the works.

Media

TV film
The Law & Order franchise has one TV film, Exiled: A Law & Order Movie (1998). Chris Noth reprises his role as Mike Logan, as the film explores what happened to the character following his departure from the original series.

TV special
A TV special titled The Paley Center Presents Law & Order: Before They Were Stars premiered on November 12, 2020 preceding the premiere of SVU season 22.

Video games
The franchise has also spawned a series of video games for the PC, which feature appearances by then-current cast members of the TV series.

The typical course of most of the games follows the original series' format with the player investigating a crime with interviews of witnesses and examination of evidence. After the arrest is made, the player then prosecutes the case with challenges such as selecting appropriate questions for witnesses on the stand, recognizing improper questions to raise objections and selecting the most persuasive arguments for the judge to allow certain evidence in court.

Law & Order: Dead on the Money
Law & Order: Double or Nothing
Law & Order: Justice Is Served
Law & Order: Criminal Intent
Law & Order: Legacies

Crossovers 

The following table lists all the crossover stories in the Law & Order franchise.

John Munch crossovers 

The character John Munch, who originated on Homicide: Life on the Street, is notable for either appearing in or being referenced in a wide variety of other series, ranging from appearing in the science fiction series The X-Files, to the sitcom Arrested Development, to being referenced by name in the UK crime drama Luther. Whether or not this places these series in the Law & Order universe is a matter of debate.

Other related series 

New York Undercover (1994–1998)
 Co-created by Kevin Arkadie and Dick Wolf, NYU was implicitly a part of the same universe as the franchise, as psychologist and psychiatrist characters from L&O appeared in the series and there were glimpses of the franchise's fictional newspaper, the New York Ledger.

Deadline (2000–2001)
 Also created by Dick Wolf, featured reporters based at the New York Ledger.

Conviction (2006)
 This series starred Stephanie March as Alexandra Cabot, Anson Mount as Jim Steele, Eric Balfour as Brian Peluso, J. August Richards as Billy Desmond, Milena Govich as Jessica Rossi, Julianne Nicholson as Christina Finn, and Jordan Bridges as Nick Potter. March reprises her role of Cabot originally from SVU and is now the Homicide Bureau Chief ADA. Cabot would return to SVU after this show's end. The series features a larger ensemble cast of young ADAs, with no police, therapists or medical examiners in lead roles. After its cancellation, two of the show's actresses, Milena Govich and Julianne Nicholson, went on to star in Law & Order and Law & Order: Criminal Intent respectively as Detectives Nina Cassady and Megan Wheeler.

Foreign adaptations 
The franchise, as a result of its popularity, has led to the adaptation of scripts from the American series into foreign-produced series. These are:

Paris enquêtes criminelles (Paris Criminal Investigations) 
 3 seasons, 20 episodes (May 3, 2007 – November 6, 2008)
Paris Criminal Investigations follows the format of Law & Order: Criminal Intent, adapted to Paris and the French legal system, with detectives from the Prefecture of Police DRPJ and  the Ministère public attempting to secure a conviction. The series stars Vincent Pérez, Sandrine Rigaux, Jacques Pater, Hélène Godec, Laure Killing, and Audrey Looten. The show is also aired in Germany on ZDF, under the title Law & Order: Paris.

Закон и Порядок. Отдел оперативных расследований (Law & Order:  Division of Field Investigations) 
 4 seasons, 84 episodes (2007–2011) 
 Division of Field Investigations follows the format of Law & Order: Special Victims Unit, set in Moscow and adapted to the Russian justice system. The series stars Ivan Oganesyan, Alisa Bogart, Dmitry Brusnikin, Alexander Naumov, Valery Troshin, and Xenia Entelis.

Закон и Порядок. Преступный умысел (Law & Order: Criminal Intent) 
 4 seasons, 84 episodes (2007–2011)
Criminal Intent follows the format of Law & Order: Criminal Intent, set in Moscow and is adapted to the Russian Justice System. The series stars Mikhail Homyakov, Igor Lagutin, Elena Kovalchuk and Boris Mironov.

Law & Order: UK
 5 series, 53 episodes (February 23, 2009 – June 11, 2014)
UK follows the format of the original Law & Order show but adapts it to the new setting of London, with detectives from the Metropolitan Police CID and  the Crown Prosecution Service attempting to secure a conviction. The series stars Bradley Walsh, Jamie Bamber, Harriet Walter, Ben Daniels, Freema Agyeman, Bill Paterson, Paul Nicholls, Dominic Rowan, Georgia Taylor, Peter Davison, Sharon Small, Paterson Joseph, and Ben Bailey Smith.

Series timeline

Location

Setting
Most of the American series have been filmed almost entirely in the New York City area. The fictional Hudson University is a recurring location across multiple series in the franchise, based on an amalgam of Columbia University and New York University, with some other colleges appearing as additional filming locations. Hudson University has also appeared less frequently in many other television series and movies, and is a fictional college in the DC universe.

The original Law & Order series has filmed a few episodes in the Los Angeles area and Baltimore; these episodes or portions of episodes were set in the cities in which they were filmed and concerned multi-jurisdictional investigations or extradition. Law & Order: LA expanded the franchise to a new main city, the new series' namesake. L&O: LA was canceled after one season.

Effects on casting
With some frequency, actors have appeared on the various series that make up the franchise, usually as different (sometimes very different) characters. This is because filming occurs in the New York City area and thus draws from the same pool of actors. Some prominent examples of the same actor playing different roles in different episodes are:

 S. Epatha Merkerson playing a maid whose child was killed in a season 1 episode of the original L&O before joining the cast in season 4 as Lieutenant Anita Van Buren and going on to be the longest-serving cast member of the parent series.  Merkerson also plays Sharon Goodwin in the Chicago franchise, which has shared numerous crossovers with SVU.
 Camryn Manheim appeared in three episodes of the original L&O in the first, third, and fourth seasons as three different characters before joining the main cast as Lieutenant Kate Dixon in the series' 21st season after being rebooted in 2022.
 Diane Neal playing a female rapist in an earlier season of Special Victims Unit before becoming the Assistant District Attorney for that series. 
 Annabella Sciorra playing a criminal defense attorney in Trial by Jury and later Det. Mike Logan's (Chris Noth) partner in Criminal Intent.
 Jerry Orbach playing a defense attorney on the original series before joining it as Det. Lennie Briscoe.
 Ice-T playing a pimp known as Seymour Stockton in the franchise's only film, Exiled: A Law & Order Movie, before taking on the role of Tutuola on SVU.
 Anthony Anderson playing Detective Lucius Blaine in a seventh-season episode of SVU before playing Bernard on the original Law & Order.
 Annie Parisse played an exotic dancer in season 12 before joining the cast as Alexandra Borgia at the start of season 15.
 Jeremy Sisto played a defense attorney in the last episode of season 17 before joining the cast as Cyrus Lupo at the start of season 18. Sisto also plays Jubal Valentine in the FBI (franchise).
 Kelli Giddish played two different characters on Criminal Intent and SVU before joining the show in season 13 as Amanda Rollins. 
 Raúl Esparza played different characters on Law & Order and Criminal Intent before joining SVU in its 14th season as Assistant District Attorney Rafael Barba.
 Peter Scanavino played multiple characters in Law & Order, Criminal Intent, Trial by Jury and SVU before joining the cast in season 16 as Dominick Carisi.

Also due to the New York filming, a number of actors appearing in  Law & Order shows have had regular or recurring roles on soaps. Most notable is Tamara Tunie, who simultaneously played both medical examiner Melinda Warner on SVU as well as (until 2007) District Attorney Jessica Griffin on As the World Turns. Likewise, New York theater actors have also been frequently cast.

Also as the result of sharing the same pool of New York–based television actors, the series' casts have had significant overlap with that of the former HBO series Oz. This is perhaps most pronounced in Law & Order: Special Victims Unit, whose cast has included three regularly credited actors (Christopher Meloni, BD Wong and Dean Winters), as well as two recurring actors (J. K. Simmons and Mike Doyle) who were also regularly credited actors on Oz, also Kathryn Erbe from Oz starring in Law & Order: Criminal Intent.  Similarly, Law & Order: UK sees significant overlap with other programs' casts; most prominently series regulars Freema Agyeman and Peter Davison, who starred in Doctor Who as companion Martha Jones and the Fifth Doctor as well as Bradley Walsh who joined the show at the same time as Jodie Whittaker the Thirteenth Doctor as her companion Graham O'Brien.

Characters in the franchise

Police

Prosecutors

Other characters

True Crime

Episode count
Episode count current as of May 30, 2022

Notes

References

External links

 Law & Order franchise - NBC Official site Archived webpage
 Law & Order - NBC's official website
 Official L&O Wolf Entertainment Website
 Law & Order – TNT's reruns website
 Law & Order: Special Victims Unit – NBC's official website
 Official SVU Wolf Entertainment Website
 USA Network's reruns website
 Law & Order: Criminal Intent – USA Network's official website
 Official CI Wolf Entertainment Website
 Law & Order: Organized Crime - NBC's official website
 Official OC Wolf Entertainment Website

 
Mass media franchises introduced in 1990
Police procedural television series
Television shows set in New York City
Television franchises
English-language television shows